Highway 378 is a highway in the Canadian province of Saskatchewan. It runs from Highway 4 near North Battleford to Highways Highway 3 in Spiritwood, just east of its intersection with Highway 24.

The highway has the distinction of travelling in both an east-west and north-south direction throughout its entire length.

Major intersections
From south to north:

References

378